The Embassy of Turkmenistan in London is the diplomatic mission of Turkmenistan in the United Kingdom.

Gallery

References

External links

Turkmenistan
Diplomatic missions of Turkmenistan
Turkmenistan–United Kingdom relations
Buildings and structures in the Royal Borough of Kensington and Chelsea
Holland Park